2C-T-28 is a lesser-known psychedelic drug related to compounds such as 2C-T-7 and 2C-T-21. It was named by Alexander Shulgin but was never made or tested by him, and was instead first synthesised by Daniel Trachsel some years later. It has a binding affinity of 75 nM at 5-HT2A and 28 nM at 5-HT2C. It is reportedly a potent psychedelic drug with an active dose in the 8–20 mg range, and a duration of action of 8–10 hours, with prominent visual effects. 2C-T-28 is the 3-fluoropropyl instead of 2-fluoroethyl chain-lengthened homologue of 2C-T-21 and has very similar properties, although unlike 2C-T-21 it will not form toxic fluoroacetate as a metabolite.

See also 
 2C-T-16
 2C-TFE
 3C-DFE
 DOPF
 Trifluoromescaline
 2C-x
 DOx
 25-NB

References 

2C (psychedelics)
Entheogens
Thioethers
Amines
Methoxy compounds